Zarnigar Agakisiyeva (Azerbaijani: Zərnigar Fəti qızı Ağakişiyeva; 1945–2018) was an Azerbaijani theatre and cinema actress, and recipient of the People's Artist of the Republic of Azerbaijan award (2000), Shohrat Order, and Azerbaijan SSR State Prize laureate.  She died from heart failure at the age of 72.

References

1945 births
2018 deaths
Azerbaijani actresses
People from Quba District (Azerbaijan)